Jarosław is a town in south-eastern Poland, with 38,970 inhabitants, as of 30 June 2014. Situated in the Subcarpathian Voivodeship (since 1999), previously in Przemyśl Voivodeship (1975–1998), it is the capital of Jarosław County.

History

Jarosław is located in the territory of the old Polish tribe of the Lendians. According to tradition, the town was established in 1031 by Yaroslav the Wise, after the area was annexed from Poland by the Kievan Rus', although the first confirmed mention of the town comes from 1152. The region was eventually regained by Poland, and the settlement was granted Magdeburg town rights by Polish Duke Władysław Opolczyk in 1375.

The city quickly developed as an important trade centre and port on the San River, reaching the period of its greatest prosperity in the 16th and 17th centuries. It had trade routes linking Silesia with Ruthenia, Gdańsk, and Hungary. Merchants from such distant countries as Spain, England, Finland, Armenia and Persia arrived for the annual three-week-long fair on the feast of the Assumption. In 1574 a Jesuit college was established in Jarosław. 

Jarosław was a private town of Polish nobility, including the Tarnowski, Jarosławski, Odrowąż, Kostka, Sieniawski, Zamoyski, Wiśniowiecki, Koniecpolski, Sobieski, Sanguszko and Czartoryski families. The Jarosławski family of Leliwa coat of arms hailed from the town.

In the 1590s Tatars from the Ottoman Empire pillaged the surrounding countryside. (See Moldavian Magnate Wars, The Magnate Wars (1593–1617), Causes.) They were unable to overcome the city's fortifications, but their raids started to diminish the city's economic strength and importance. Outbreaks of bubonic plague in the 1620s, and the invasion known as the Swedish Deluge in 1655–60 further undermined the city's prominence. In March 1656, led by Polish national hero Stefan Czarniecki, the Poles defeated the invading Swedes under King Charles X Gustav in the Battle of Jarosław. In the Great Northern War of 1700-21, the region was repeatedly pillaged by Russian, Saxon, and Swedish armies, causing the city to decline further.

In the mid-eighteenth century, Roman Catholics constituted 53.7% of the population, members of the Greek Catholic Church 23.9%, and Jews 22.3%.

Jarosław was annexed by Austria in the First Partition of Poland in 1772. It was part of newly formed Galicia (Austrian Partition) until Poland regained independence in 1918 following World War I. In the interbellum the city was administratively located in the Polish Lwów Voivodeship.

During the German invasion of Poland in September 1939, which started World War II, this was the site of the Battle of Jarosław. Germany defeated the Poles and captured the town. Shortly afterwards the German Einsatzgruppe I entered the town to commit various atrocities against the population. Under German occupation, the town was part of the Kraków District of the General Government. The Polish resistance movement was active in the town, and from May 1940, the underground Polish newspaper Odwet was distributed in Jarosław. 

In 1944, the town was captured by the Red Army of the Soviet Union and restored to Poland, although with a Soviet-installed communist regime. Communists remained in power in the Polish Soviet Republic until the Fall of Communism in the 1980s. Some local Polish resistance officers were arrested by the Soviets and imprisoned in a Soviet camp in Trzebuska. The communists expelled most of Jarosław's Ukrainian population, at first to Soviet territories and later to territories regained from Germany.

Jewish Jarosław
The first Jews reportedly arrived in Jarosław in 1464. The first rabbi of Jarosław was Rabbi Nathan Neta Ashkenazi, in 1590. A year later, the new Council of Four Lands (Vaad Arba Aratzot) began convening in Jarosław, rotating the meeting with the city of Lwów (Lviv). 
 
Until 1608 with a small Jewish community, religious facilities were not allowed. Still, Rabbi Solomon Efraim of Lontschitz (the author of "Kli Yakar"), a prominent and well known rabbi, lived here. By 1670 there was a large "government" synagogue created, although protested by the Christian community of the city. During attacks on the city by Tatars and Swedes, Jewish merchandise and sometimes homes were set on fire. In 1765, there were 1,884 Jews in the city and towns around it. A Jewish school was established sometime later. The famous rabbi Levi Isaac of Berdyczów (Berdychiv) studied in Jarosław circa 1760 and was called "the genius of Yeruslav". A fire in 1805 burnt down the old synagogue and a new one was established more according to tradition to replace it. The new synagogue was completed in 1811. A census taken in 1901 notes that Jews were 25% of the population: 5701 Jewish families.

In a story about Jacob Kranc told by Rabbi Jacob Orenstein around 1850, about the appointment of the Jarosław rabbi, Rabbi Orenstein had refused the appointment of Rabbi of Jarosław because it would be against his old uncle's appointment. The city council had already written his appointment and wished to express their sorrow for its cancellation. The Dubner Magid had just entered the city on a snowy winter day, and was taken directly to Orenstein's house, together with the city council, who happened to pass by him. But the walk up the steps was enough to create a moving speech, remembered years later, and accounted for in the book.

In 1921 the last rabbi was appointed, Rabbi Shmaiya HaLevi Steinberg. He wrote a book about the Jews of his town, and in the 1930s sent two copies to the National Hebrew Library in Jerusalem. These copies are the only surviving copies of the book after the Holocaust.

In September 1939, Jarosław was captured by Germans. Most of the Jews crossed the San river to the Soviet-occupied part of Poland and hid in the Carpathian mountains, including the elder rabbi and his family. Those that stayed were shot and killed by the German soldiers.

Sights

Landmarks

Sports

Jarosław is a town with a long sports history. In 1889, a branch of the "Sokół" Polish Gymnastic Society was founded in Jarosław. Nowadays, the town's most notable sports club are:
 JKS 1909 Jarosław, one of the region's oldest football teams, which competes in the lower leagues
 Znicz Jarosław, men's basketball team, which competed in the Polish Basketball League (country's top division) in the past, most recently in the 2009–10 season
 JKS Jarosław, women's handball team, which competes in the Polish Women's Superliga (country's top division)

Notable people

Twin towns - sister cities
Jarosław is twinned with:

Gallery

References

External links
 Jarosław city portal
 Jewish Jarosław (Hebrew)
 Jarosław (Yaruslav) Hassidim in Modern day Israel

 
Cities and towns in Podkarpackie Voivodeship
Jarosław County
Populated places in the Kingdom of Galicia and Lodomeria
Lwów Voivodeship
Ruthenian Voivodeship
Shtetls
Holocaust locations in Poland